Nola phaeogramma is a moth of the family Nolidae. It found in Australia.

External links
Markku Savela's Lepidoptera pages

phaeogramma
Moths of Australia
Endemic flora of Australia
Moths described in 1944